Michaeliskloster is a monastery building in Rostock, Mecklenburg-Vorpommern, Germany. It was a home to the Brethren of the Common Life, and hosted major printing and bookbinding of the late Middle Ages. In April 1942, after British bombing raid completely burned the monastery, it was in ruins. The eastern section was restored in the 1950s and the United Methodist congregation transferred to it. The historic exterior back of the west wing was retrofitted in 1994 with reproduced form bricks and other special-sized bricks which were adapted to the character and physical properties of the original bricks. In the present day, the University of Rostock Library houses its special collections in Michaeliskloster.

References

Bibliography
 Nilüfer Krüger: Die Rostocker Brüder vom Gemeinsamen Leben zu Sankt Michael. Hommage zur baulichen Vollendung des ehemaligen Michaelisklosters im Herbst 1999. Universitätsbibliothek Rostock, Rostock 1999 (Veröffentlichungen der Universität Rostock 127). (German language)
 Nilüfer Krüger: 525 Jahre Buchdruck in Rostock. Die Druckerei der Brüder vom Gemeinsamen Leben. Universitätsbibliothek Rostock, Rostock 2001 (Veröffentlichungen der Universität Rostock 132). (German language)
 Nilüfer Krüger: Von der Klosterdruckerei zur wissenschaftlichen Bibliothek. Das Michaeliskloster der Brüder vom Gemeinsamen Leben in Rostock. Universitätsbibliothek Rostock, Rostock 2004 (Veröffentlichungen der Universität Rostock 134). (German language)
 Georg Christian Friedrich Lisch: Buchdruckerei der Brüder vom gemeinsamen Leben zu St. Michael in Rostock. In: Jahrbücher des Vereins für Mecklenburgische Geschichte und Altertumskunde. Bd. 4, 1839, P. 1–62, Digitalisat. (German language)
 Carl Meltz: Die Drucke der Michaelisbrüder zu Rostock 1476 bis 1530. In: Wissenschaftliche Zeitschrift der Universität Rostock. Reihe 5: Mathematisch-naturwissenschaftliche Reihe. Sonderheft, 1955/56, P. 229–262. (German language)

External links

Churches in Mecklenburg-Western Pomerania
Buildings and structures in Rostock
Rostock
Rostock Michael
Rostock Michael
University of Rostock
Rostock Michael
Rostock